Dr. Sapam Budhichandra Singh (born 1 March 1949) is an Indian Politician and a Member of State Legislative Assembly of Manipur representing Konthoujam Assembly Constituency since 2004. He was elected unopposed as the Speaker of Ninth Manipur Legislative Assembly on 16 March 2007. He is a member of the Indian National Congress.

Early life

Dr. Sapam Budhichandra Singh was born in Konthoujam Awang Leikai in Imphal West District of Manipur, India to Sapam Mani Singh and the late Sapam Ongbi Konthoujam Angoubi Devi.

He attended Konthoujam LP School, Awang Khunou ME School, Johnstone Higher Secondary School and D.M College and later joined  Assam Medical College for his MBBS Degree,  M.D in Radio Diagnosis from Banaras Hindu University, U.P and  Freiberg University, Germany.

As a doctor by profession he had served in various parts of Manipur . He was the head of Department of Radio diagnosis in Jawaharlal Nehru Hospital before he took voluntary retirement in the year 1999, after 27 years of government service.

Political career

Dr. Sapam Budhichandra Singh had served as a General Secretary of Manipur Pradesh Congress Committee (I) from the year 2000. He served as a  Member, Election Committee of Manipur Pradesh Congress Committee(I) from 2001 to 2004.

As a Speaker of Manipur Legislative Assembly, he attended 53rd, 54th, and 55th Commonwealth Parliamentary Association Conference held in New Delhi (India), Kuala Lumpur (Malaysia) and Arusha (Tanzania) in the year 2007, 2008 and 2009.

Personal life
Dr. Sapam Budhichandra Singh  married  Dr. Khwairakpam Tamubi Devi (Daughter of Late Khwairakpam Chaoba, who represented Sekmai Assembly Constituency, from the late 1940s to early 1980s). He has three children, two sons and a daughter.

References

External links
1. http://manipursacs.nic.in/html/state_legis.html
2. http://manipurassembly.nic.in/html/speaker-present.html
3. http://www.e-pao.net/GP.asp?src=1.10.171004.oct04
5. http://www.e-pao.net/GP.asp?src=21..300109.jan09
6. http://thesangaiexpress.com/News%20archieves(English)/July-2009/July%2009%20(2009).html
7. 

1949 births
Living people
Indian National Congress politicians
People from Imphal West district
Speakers of the Manipur Legislative Assembly
Manipur politicians
Bharatiya Janata Party politicians from Manipur
Manipur MLAs 2022–2027
Manipur MLAs 2017–2022
Manipur MLAs 2012–2017
Manipur MLAs 2007–2012
Manipur MLAs 2002–2007